Calathus asturiensis is a species of ground beetle from the Platyninae subfamily that can be found in France and Spain.

References

asturiensis
Beetles described in 1866
Beetles of Europe